Half Acre is an unincorporated community located within Monroe Township in Middlesex County, New Jersey, United States. The settlement is located roughly at the intersection of Prospect Plains Road (County Route 614) and Half Acre Road (CR 615) in the center of the township. Some single-family homes and small businesses are located along those two roads and Cranbury-Half Acre Road but most of the area is made up of age-restricted housing developments including Concordia, Clearbrook Park, Greenbriar at Whittingham, and Encore at Monroe.

References

Monroe Township, Middlesex County, New Jersey
Unincorporated communities in Middlesex County, New Jersey
Unincorporated communities in New Jersey